No. 615 (County of Surrey) Squadron was a unit of the British Auxiliary Air Force and later the Royal Auxiliary Air Force between 1937 and 1957.

History

Formation and early years
No. 615 squadron was formed at RAF Kenley as part of the Auxiliary Air Force on 1 June 1937 and was initially equipped with the Hawker Audax in the army-cooperation role. By the end of the year it had received Hawker Hectors which it flew until November 1938, when it received Gloster Gauntlets and became a fighter squadron at the same time.

Second World War
1939–1942
The squadron went to France as part of the Air Component of the British Expeditionary Force in November 1939, having re-equipped with Gloster Gladiators in May.

Conversion to Hawker Hurricanes took place just prior to the German invasion of France, but by 20 May 1940 the squadron was back at Kenley. "B" Flight were based at Saint Inglevert during the early part of 1940.

615 squadron took part in the early actions of the Battle of Britain, but then moved to Scotland to rest. It later took part in offensive sweeps over Europe and defence duties in Wales.

1942–45
In April 1942 the squadron was transferred to the South East Asian theatre, initially to India, before moving closer to the front lines in Burma, during December 1942. but returned to India to re-equip in May 1943, receiving Supermarine Spitfires in October. It returned to operations on the Burma front in November but was recalled to India again, for defensive duties in August 1944. The transfer, from Palel to Biagachi, near Calcutta was scheduled for 10 August. Despite a favourable weather forecast, the squadron encountered a violent monsoon storm en route. Eight of the 16 aircraft, including that of the commanding officer, Squadron Leader Dave McCormack, DFC, were lost.

1945
The squadron returned to Burma in February 1945. On 10 June 1945, the 615 Squadron was officially disbanded – although No. 135 Squadron RAF was renamed 615 Squadron that same day, at RAF Cuttack, Orissa. The new 615 Squadron was equipped with Republic Thunderbolts and began training for proposed landings in Malaya. Air support was not required, however, following the surrender of Japan and the squadron disbanded on 25 September at RAF Vizagapatam, Andhra Pradesh.

Post-war
With the reactivation of the Royal Auxiliary Air Force, No. 615 Squadron was reformed on 10 May 1946 at RAF Biggin Hill as a day fighter squadron equipped with Spitfire F.14s. Spitfire F.21s were received in 1947 and these were replaced by F.22s in 1948, both marks being flown until 1950.

600 and 615 squadron were great rivals. No 600 had the Queen Mother as Honorary Air Commodore and 615 had Sir Winston Churchill. When the Queen Mother first flew in the pilot's seat of a Comet she caused a telegram to be sent saying: "Today I have flown higher and faster than any of the pilots at Biggin Hill." On another occasion when Sir Winston Churchill was at Biggin he called over the CO of the rival squadron and asked him to send a telegram to the Queen Mother saying:"I have today presented to my squadron the Esher Trophy."  Later he wrote: 'It was a great joy to me to be made an honorary member of 615. They were equally good at work or play. I remember visiting them at summer camp at Horsham St Faith. After the day's flying the squadron funds were raided and launches hired on the Norfolk Broads. At one or two selected stopping-places the adjutant went into the nearest hostelry and to the consternation of the locals ordered 86 pints and four lemonades'.

The squadron re-equipped with Gloster Meteor F.4 jet fighters starting in September 1950. Meteor F.8s were received in September 1951 and these were flown in the annual UK air defence exercises and at annual summer training camps. Along with all other flying units of the RAuxAF, No. 615 was disbanded on 10 March 1957.

Notable Squadron members
 Winston Churchill, appointed Honorary Air Commodore of the Squadron on 4 April 1939.  
 Neville Duke, famous test pilot.
 Hedley Fowler, achieved the squadron's first kill; became a PoW and later escaped from Colditz.
 Arthur Vere Harvey, squadron commander; a Conservative Member of Parliament post-war.
 Petrus Hugo, South African ace and Commanding Officer
 Joseph Kayll, commander during Battle of France, then Battle of Britain Ace.
 Ronald Gustave Kellett, Second World War ace and post-war commander of the squadron
 Henry Lafont, Famous Free French pilot of the Second World War, who died on 2 December 2011, the last surviving French veteran of the Battle of Britain. With René Mouchotte (below), escaped from Algeria in 1940 and flew to Gibraltar to join the Free French forces.
 René Mouchotte, Famous Free French pilot of the Second World War who died on 27 August 1943, first Free-French officer to hold the position of flight commander in the RAF. His memoirs were published in 1946 under the title Les carnets de René Mouchotte.
 Alexander Obolensky, A Russian Prince, and popularly known as "The Flying Prince", "The Flying Slav", or simply as "Obo". An international rugby player for England, scored 2 tries in a legendary All Blacks match. Died 29 March 1940 in a Hawker Hurricane training accident.

Aircraft operated

Squadron bases

Commanding officers

References

Notes

Bibliography

External links

 squadron histories for nos. 611–620 sqn
 Squadron History 615 Sqn

615 Squadron
Fighter squadrons of the Royal Air Force in World War II
RAF squadrons involved in the Battle of Britain
Military units and formations established in 1937